Reksten is a Norwegian surname. Notable people with this surname include:

 Dennis Reksten, Norwegian musician
 Egil Reksten (1917–2009), Norwegian engineer
 Grace Reksten Skaugen (born 1953), Norwegian executive
 Hilmar Reksten (1897–1980), Norwegian shipping magnate

Norwegian-language surnames